Dauphin Royal was a 74-gun ship of the line of the Royal French Royal Navy, designed in 1735 by Blaise Ollivier and constructed in 1735 to 1740 at Brest Dockyard.

Construction 
Dauphin Royal and the contemporary Superbe, also built at Brest over the same period, were the last French 74-gun ships to have only thirteen pairs of lower deck guns (subsequent 74-gun French ships all were constructed with a fourteenth pair of lower deck guns). In 1747, she was rebuilt at Brest and reduced to 70 guns by the removal of her poop guns.

Career 
In early 1744, Dauphin Royal was part of the squadron under Roquefeuil for a cruise in the Channel.

In 1755, she sailed to Canada under Captain de Montalais. In 1757, she was laid up in ordinary at Rochefort.

Dauphin Royal took part in the Battle of Quiberon Bay on 20 November 1759 under Captain d'Uturbie Fragosse.

In 1788, under Nieuil, Dauphin Royal was the lead ship of the Second Division in the White-and-Blue squadron of the fleet under Orvilliers. She took part in the Battle of Ushant, the Invasion of Minorca in 1781, and the Battle of Saint Kitts on 25/26 January 1782. Dauphin Royal and her commander Roquefeuil-Montpeyroux also took part in the Battle of the Saintes on 12 April 1782.

Fate
She was condemned in September 1783 and sold in June 1787 to be broken up.

Sources and references 
 Notes

Citations

References
 
 
 

Ships of the line of the French Navy
1730s ships